Asalikent is a rural locality (a selo) in Ispiksky Selsoviet, Suleyman-Stalsky District, Republic of Dagestan, Russia. The population was 324 as of 2010. There are 8 streets.

Geography 
Salyan is the nearest rural locality.

References 

Rural localities in Suleyman-Stalsky District